Aethalopteryx squameus is a moth in the family Cossidae. It is found in South Africa, Botswana, Mozambique, Malawi, Ghana, Angola and Tanzania.

References

Moths described in 1902
Aethalopteryx
Moths of Africa
Insects of Namibia
Insects of Angola